Stenomimus is a genus of true weevils in the beetle family Curculionidae. There are more than 30 described species in Stenomimus.

Species
These 34 species belong to the genus Stenomimus:

 Stenomimus angustatus Hustache, 1932
 Stenomimus armatus Champion & G.C., 1909
 Stenomimus atomus Hustache, 1932
 Stenomimus constricticollis Champion & G.C., 1914
 Stenomimus cordillerae Voss, 1954
 Stenomimus corticalis Blatchley, W.S., Leng & C.W., 1916
 Stenomimus dirutus Champion & G.C., 1909
 Stenomimus dubius Blatchley, W.S., Leng & C.W., 1916
 Stenomimus dufaui Hustache, 1932
 Stenomimus filiformis Hustache, 1932
 Stenomimus filirostris Champion & G.C., 1909
 Stenomimus fryi Wollaston & T.V., 1873
 Stenomimus guatemalensis Champion & G.C., 1909
 Stenomimus latirostris Hustache, 1932
 Stenomimus nitidus Csiki & E., 1936
 Stenomimus orientalis Champion, 1914
 Stenomimus ovaticollis Champion & G.C., 1909
 Stenomimus ovatulus Kuschel, 1959
 Stenomimus pallidus (Boheman, 1845)
 Stenomimus persimilis Hustache, 1932
 Stenomimus politus Casey & T.L., 1892
 Stenomimus pumilus Hustache, 1932
 Stenomimus quichensis Champion & G.C., 1909
 Stenomimus rhyncoloides Champion & G.C., 1909
 Stenomimus rufipes Champion & G.C., 1909
 Stenomimus rugirostris Champion & G.C., 1909
 Stenomimus serenus Csiki & E., 1936
 Stenomimus striatus Hustache, 1932
 Stenomimus sublaevipennis Hustache, 1932
 Stenomimus suturalis Hustache, 1932
 Stenomimus venezolanus Kuschel, 1959
 Stenomimus veraepacis Champion & G.C., 1909
 Stenomimus vicinus Hustache, 1932
 Stenomimus wollastoni Champion & G.C., 1909

References

Further reading

 
 
 

Cossoninae
Articles created by Qbugbot